The Midwest League of Minor League Baseball is one of three High-A baseball leagues in the United States. It was previously known as the Illinois State League from 1947 to 1948 and as the Mississippi-Ohio Valley League form 1949 to 1955, but has been the Midwest League since 1956 (with the exception of 2021 when known as the High-A Central). A league champion is determined at the end of each season. Champions have been determined by postseason playoffs, winning the regular season pennant, or being declared champion by the league office. For 2019, eight teams qualified for the postseason: the first- and second-half winners within each division, Eastern and Western, and wild card teams (the teams with the best second-place record) from each half in each division. Teams within each division met in a best-of-three quarterfinal round. The winners met in a best-of-three semifinal series to determine division champions. Then, the Eastern and Western division winners played a best-of-five series to determine a league champion. As of 2022, the winners of each division from both the first and second halves of the season meet in a best-of-three division series, with the winners of the two division series meeting in a best-of-three championship series.

League champions
Score and finalist information is only presented when postseason play occurred. The lack of this information indicates a declared league champion.

Championship wins by team
Active Midwest League teams appear in bold.

Notes
 Centralia was declared champion after inclement weather and military call-ups forced the cancellation of the playoffs.
 Kane County was declared champion after the playoffs were cancelled in the wake of the September 11 terrorist attacks, which caused a stoppage in professional baseball.
 Burlington was declared champion after inclement weather forced the playoffs to be cut short.

References

C
Midwest
Midwest League champions
Midwest League